The First $20 Million Is Always the Hardest is a 2002 film based on the novel of the same name by technology-culture writer Po Bronson. The film stars Adam Garcia and Rosario Dawson. The screenplay was written by Jon Favreau and Gary Tieche.

Plot
Andy Kasper is a marketer who quits his job in search of something more fulfilling. He gets hired at LaHonda Research Institute, where Francis Benoit assigns him to design the PC99, a $99 PC. He moves into a run-down apartment building where he meets his neighbor Alisa, who's an artist, and puts together a team of unassigned employees. The team includes: Salman Fard, a short, foreign man with an accent who is hacking into CIA files when Andy meets him; Curtis "Tiny" Russell, a massively obese, anthropophobic man; and Darrell, a tall, blond, pierced, scary, germaphobic, deep-voiced man with personal space issues who regularly refers to himself in the third person.

The team finds many non-essential parts but cannot come close to the $99 mark. It is Salman's idea to put all the software on the internet, eliminating the need for a hard drive, RAM, a CD-ROM drive, a floppy drive, and anything that holds information. The computer has been reduced to a microprocessor, a monitor, a mouse, a keyboard, and the internet, but it is still too expensive. Having seen the rest of his team watching a hologram of an attractive lady the day before, in a dream Andy is inspired to eliminate the monitor in favor of the cheaper holographic projector. The last few hundred dollars come off when Darrell suggests using virtual reality gloves in place of a mouse and keyboard. Tiny then writes a "hypnotizer" code to link the gloves, the projector, and the internet, and they're done.

But immediately before he finishes, the whole team (except for Tiny, who is still writing the code) quits LaHonda after being told that there are no more funds for their project, but sign a non-exclusive patent waiver, meaning that LaHonda will share the patent rights to any technology they had developed up to that point. After leaving LaHonda, they pitch their product to numerous companies, but do not get accepted, mainly because the prototype emagi (electronic magic) was ugly, and something always seemed to go wrong during the demonstration of their product.

Alisa, whose relationship with Andy has been growing steadily, helps improve the emagi's looks, which helps the team with their callback with executive. They agree to give her 51% of their company in exchange for getting their product manufactured and for getting Andy's Porsche bought back, which he had had to sell in order to raise money to build a new emagi after leaving LaHonda. Unfortunately, she then sells the patent rights to the emagi to Francis Benoit, who plans to sell the emagi at $999 a piece and reap a huge profit.

The team interrupts the meeting in which Benoit is going to introduce the emagi to the world and introduces an even newer computer he and his team developed and manufactured at LaHonda, which was in a state of disaster when they arrived. It was a small silver tube that projected a hologram and lasers which would detect where the hands were, eliminating the need even for virtual reality gloves. Andy then reminds Benoit of the non-exclusive patent waiver, which had been Benoit's idea in the first place.

Cast 

 Adam Garcia as Andy Kasper
 Rosario Dawson as Alisa
 Anjul Nigam as Salman Fard 
 Ethan Suplee as Curtis "Tiny" Russell 
 Jake Busey as Darrell
 Enrico Colantoni as Francis Benoit

Production
The film was made by 20th Century Fox at the cost of $17 million and is sometimes shown on HBO. The video and DVD received limited release in New York and Los Angeles. Its domestic gross was just $5,491, making it one of the greatest flops in movie history.

Po Bronson played a cameo role in the film as one of many tuba players living in the same building as the main character. The tentative title for this movie during test screenings was "The Big Idea".

References

External links
 

2002 films
Films about computing
2002 comedy films
American comedy films
Films set in the San Francisco Bay Area
Films shot in San Francisco
Films directed by Mick Jackson
2000s English-language films
2000s American films